UNDO Visual Thinking is a bi-monthly mexican magazine of graphic design and art which focus in social and cultural issues. Is an in-house project of poeticsouvenir, an editorial design studio with base in Puebla, Mexico inspired by the 'good design is good citizenship" Milton Glaser's philosophy.

Collaborations
Several designers / artists have collaborated with the magazine to produce issues.

UNDO issue 01 Politics: Art direction and design by Edgar Reyes
UNDO issue 02 Consumption: Special collaboration by Monica Peon, a Mexican graphic designer graduated in Design 2D by the Cranbrook Academy of Art in 1998, she worked at the Studio Dumbar a design agency, established by Gert Dumbar in 1977 with base in The Netherlands.  She Co-founded Igloo Design, a design studio specialized in editorial and motion graphics with base in Mexico City, she explain her studio philosophy in this way to the Communication Arts magazine: "We are aiming for a design that reinvents the local but works globally. That is personal and sensitive to immediate concerns and is aware of belonging to a broader environment. That moves your guts, that punches you in the face and then you look closer.”

See also
 List of Mexican magazines

External links
 UNDO visual thinking

2006 establishments in Mexico
Bi-monthly magazines
Magazines established in 2006
Magazines published in Mexico
Mass media in Puebla (city)
Design magazines